The 1947–48 Minnesota–Duluth Bulldogs men's ice hockey season was the 4th season of play for the program but first under the oversight of the NCAA. The Bulldogs represented the University of Minnesota Duluth and were coached by Hank Jensen in his 1st season.

Season

Roster

Standings

Schedule and results

|-
!colspan=12 style=";" | Regular Season

References

External links 

Minnesota Duluth Bulldogs men's ice hockey seasons
Minnesota–Duluth
Minnesota–Duluth
Minnesota–Duluth